Stephen F. Brauer (born September 3, 1945) is an American businessman, philanthropist, and former U.S. Ambassador to Belgium (2001–2003). Brauer is currently chairman of Hunter Engineering Company, a manufacturer of automotive service equipment and technology that is headquartered in St. Louis, Missouri.

Life
Born in St. Louis, Brauer attended St. Louis Country Day School, attended Washington and Lee University, and graduated from Westminster College, where he received a B.A. in economics in 1967. He served as 1st Lt. in the United States Army Corps of Engineers from 1968 to 1970, including a year tour in Vietnam. Brauer also served as Civilian Aide to the Secretary of the Army from 1991 to 1994. He began his career with Hunter Engineering Company in 1971, later becoming the chief operating officer in 1978 and chief executive officer in 1980. In May 2001, Brauer was confirmed by the U.S. Senate, and on June 1, 2001, he was sworn in as U.S. Ambassador to Belgium. He returned to the U.S. in September 2003 to resume his duties as CEO of Hunter Engineering Company.

Charity
Brauer has served on various charitable and civic boards, including the St. Louis Area Council of Boy Scouts, St. Louis Country Day School, St. Louis Art Museum, and the Missouri Botanical Garden; of which he is a past president of the board of trustees. Since 1991, Brauer has been a trustee of Washington University and served as chair of the board (2009–2014). In 2008, he provided the lead gift for the Stephen F. & Camilla T. Brauer building (Brauer Hall) on the engineering school campus. Brauer is also a former member of the national board of the Smithsonian Institution, a past member of Missouri's 21st Judicial District Commission, and was a director of Boatmen's Trust Company, the Private Client Board of Bank of America, and Ameren Corporation (NYSE:AEE).

References

1945 births
Living people
Missouri Republicans
21st-century American diplomats
Ambassadors of the United States to Belgium
Washington and Lee University alumni
Westminster College (Missouri) alumni
American chairpersons of corporations
Businesspeople from St. Louis
United States Army Corps of Engineers personnel
Washington University in St. Louis people
Trustees of educational establishments